Ahmed Nader El Sayed (born 16 March 2003), is an Egyptian professional footballer who plays as a goalkeeper for Vizela, on loan from Zamalek.

Club career
Having risen through the youth ranks of Zamalek, Nader was invited to train with the first team in March 2021. After continuing to shine for the under-23 side, he was loaned to Portuguese Primeira Liga side Vizela in September of the same year. Initially assigned to the youth sides, Nader's good performances saw him promoted to the first team in January 2022, in preparation for the Taça de Portugal game against Moreirense. Although he did not feature, he was named on the bench.

International career
Nader has represented Egypt at under-20 level.

After Nader's perceived misjudgement of a cross at the 2021 Arab Cup U-20, leading to Saudi Arabia's eventual 3–2 win, Nader was criticised on social media by a number of fans. Former Egypt international goalkeeper Sherif Ekramy came to his defence, calling the criticism a "moral crime".

Personal life
Ahmed is the son of former Egyptian international goalkeeper Nader El-Sayed.

References

External links

2003 births
Living people
Egyptian footballers
Egypt youth international footballers
Association football goalkeepers
Zamalek SC players
F.C. Vizela players
Egyptian expatriate footballers
Egyptian expatriate sportspeople in Portugal
Expatriate footballers in Portugal